Mohammad Rizwan Asif (born 8 January 1990) is a Pakistani football player, who plays as a winger for Khan Research Laboratories. 

Asif has won five league titles and five National Challenge Cup with the club. He made his international debut for senior side on 4 April 2009 against Chinese Taipei in a 1–1 draw during 2010 AFC Challenge Cup qualifiers.

Club career

Khan Research Laboratories
Asif started his career with Khan Research Laboratories, winning his first ever league title in his debut season. He further won three more back to back league titles with the club. He also has the most number of National Football Challenge Cup trophies, winning it five times.

Career statistics

Club

International

International goals

Goals for senior national team

Honours
Khan Research Laboratories
 Pakistan Premier League: 2009–10, 2011–12, 2012–13, 2013–14, 2018–19
 National Football Challenge Cup: 2010, 2011, 2012, 2015, 2016

References

External links
 Rizwan Asif Soccerway
 Rizwan Asif GSA

Pakistani footballers
Pakistan international footballers
Living people
1990 births
Footballers at the 2010 Asian Games
Association football wingers
Khan Research Laboratories F.C. players
Asian Games competitors for Pakistan